Peter Laurence (born 11 December 1931) is a Kenyan former sports shooter. He competed in the 25 metre pistol event at the 1972 Summer Olympics.

References

External links
 

1931 births
Possibly living people
Kenyan male sport shooters
Olympic shooters of Kenya
Shooters at the 1972 Summer Olympics
Commonwealth Games competitors for Kenya
Shooters at the 1966 British Empire and Commonwealth Games
Place of birth missing (living people)